The 1928–29 Drexel Dragons men's basketball team represented Drexel Institute of Art, Science and Industry during the 1928–29 men's basketball season. The Dragons were led by 2nd year head coach Walter Halas.

Drexel planned to open their season at the newly constructed Curtis Hall Gym on December 19, 1928, against Penn, however construction was not complete in time, and the game was moved to Palestra.  The team began the season playing home games at Main Building, as they had the previous season, and informally opened Curtis Hall Gym on January 9, 1929, against Philadelphia Osteopathic, playing in the unfinished gym.

Roster

Schedule

|-
!colspan=9 style="background:#F8B800; color:#002663;"| Regular season
|-

References

Drexel Dragons men's basketball seasons
Drexel
1928 in sports in Pennsylvania
1929 in sports in Pennsylvania